Metropolitan Cagayan de Oro, also known as Metro Cagayan de Oro, is the fourth largest metropolitan area in the Philippines. It is located on the northern coast of Mindanao, and comprises the two chartered cities of Cagayan de Oro and El Salvador and the fourteen municipalities of Misamis Oriental which are Alubijid, Balingasag, Claveria, Gitagum, Initao, Jasaan, Laguindingan, Libertad, Lugait, Manticao, Naawan, Opol, Tagoloan, and Villanueva and the six municipalities of Bukidnon which are Manolo Fortich, Baungon, Libona, Malitbog, Sumilao and Talakag. According to the 2015 Philippine census, Metro Cagayan de Oro has a population of 1,687,159 people.

Geography
Metro Cagayan de Oro is bounded by Macajalar Bay, which curves north.  Forty percent of its area is elevated plains, located partially in Bukidnon. In the western portion the Cagayan de Oro River outlines the area, which is divided by the river's tributaries from district 1 of Cagayan de Oro to Gitagum (including Laguindingan, Alubijid, El Salvador and Opol). The eastern and southern regions run from district 2 of Cagayan de Oro to Tagoloan to Claveria and Malitbog to Talakag, which is bordered by Bukidnon-Central Mindanao and Lanao del Norte.

Metro Cagayan comprises hills and mountain ranges, mountains and rain forests. Its biodiversity and greenery helps keep the area's temperature cool. The southern portion has semi-active volcanoes in the Kalatungan Mountain Range, although the Philippine Institute of Volcanology and Seismology (PhilVolcs) maintains that there is little risk of eruption or
earthquakes.

Climate
In June 1998, the city recorded its highest temperature to date, . The city receives a varying amount of rainfall throughout the year; March and April are the driest months, and August and September the wettest. The rainy season lasts from June to November, and the drier season from December to May. The city lies outside the typhoon belt, but is affected by the Intertropical Convergence Zone.

Government 

Cagayan de Oro is a chartered city which is geographically located in [Misamis Oriental]. Although, the provincial Capitol of Misamis Oriental is located in Cagayan de Oro, the provincial government has no administrative authority and jurisdiction over the city government of Cagayan de Oro. 

Metro Cagayan de Oro has the fourth-largest population in the Philippines, and is the third-largest metropolitan area geographically. Cagayan de Oro City is the center of the Metro Cagayan de Oro, the emerging 4th metropolis of the country. Metro Cagayan de Oro covers municipalities in eastern and western Misamis Oriental and northern Bukidnon].

Since the 1986 People Power Revolution, political power has returned to Misamis Oriental. Each city and municipality is self-governing, divided into barangays led by mayors.

Demographics 

Metro Cagayan de Oro is inhabited by distinct Visayan cultural communities. Christianity (particularly Roman Catholicism) is the predominant religion. Several cultural minorities exist in central Mindanao (Talakag, Sumilao and Baungon), including the Bagobos, Subanons and Badjaos. The city of Cagayan de Oro has a population of 675,950 people, making it the most-populous city in northern Mindanao and the tenth in the country.

Religion

Roman Catholicism is the predominant religion, although Protestant denominations (including Pentecostalism and the Seventh-day Adventist Church are increasing in numbers. Followers of Islam were mainly Maranao traders and immigrants.

Population
About 44 percent of households in Metro Cagayan de Oro classify themselves as ethnically mixed, 22.15 percent as Cebuano and 4.38 percent as Boholano; 28.07 percent are from other ethnic groups, including Maranao and Bukidnon. In addition to the city of Cagayan de Oro, there is rapid growth in nearby cities and municipalities (including Tagoloan and El Salvador). According to the Statistical Yearbook of the Philippines, this urban growth is a result of migration from neighboring provinces.

Cultural communities and ethnic groups living primarily in remote areas of Talakag, Baungon and Bukidnon include the Maranaws, T’boli and Bagobo. These groups have declined in population by about 12 percent since 2000 and, despite comprising 20.4 percent of the population of Mindanao, they experience discrimination in Filipino society.

Economy 

Cagayan de Oro is the "melting pot of Mindanao" because of its accessibility, business growth and attractions. It is a business hub of the northern Mindanao region, with a reported income of ₱1.8 billion in fiscal year 2010. The city's economy is based on industry, commerce, trade, services and tourism. The city of Cagayan de Oro reported seven billion pesos in investment  during the first six months of 2012, primarily in the service and industrial sectors. Investment in Metro Cagayan de Oro focuses on tourism, agriculture and the hospitality industry.

Healthcare
Metro Cagayan de Oro has a number of hospitals:

In addition, Every municipalities has public health center and/or mini-hospital that caters their constituents for minor health cases under the supervision of Local government Units and Department of Health.

Public
 Cagayan de Oro Medical Central
 J.R. Borja Memorial Hospital City Hospital
 German Doctors Hospital
 Northern Mindanao Medical Center

Private
 Cagayan de Oro Medical Center
 Capitol University Medical Center
 Sabal General Hospital
 Madonna and Child Hospital
 Maria Reyna Xavier University Hospital
 Orthopedic Rehab Institute
 Polymedic Medical Group
 Cagayan Polymedic General Hospital
 Cagayan Polymedic General Plaza
 Tagoloan Polymedic General Hospital
 Puerto General Hospital

Education

Education, which has the largest share (about 40 percent) of the Metro Cagayan de Oro budget, is supervised by the Northern Mindanao Region X Department of Education. The 2010 census counted 203 schools in the metropolis, including six universities, 12 colleges, 52 high schools and 64 elementary and primary schools (primarily in urban areas). The student population of Metro Cagayan de Oro is estimated at 380,580.

Colleges and universities in Metro Cagayan de Oro are:

Colleges
 AMA Computer University
 Cagayan de Oro College - PHINMA Education Network
 Informatics Computer Institute of Cagayan de Oro
 Lourdes College (Cagayan de Oro)
 Pilgrim Christian College
 STI College - Cagayan de Oro
 Tagoloan Community College
 Opol Community College
 Blessed Mother College
 Southern Philippines College
 Misamis Oriental State College of Agriculture and Technology

Universities
 Capitol University
 Liceo de Cagayan University
 University of Science and Technology of Southern Philippines
 Xavier University – Ateneo de Cagayan

Transportation

Land 
Metro Cagayan de Oro is accessible by land. There are three bus and jeepney terminals with regular service: Agora Integrated Bus Terminal, Eastbound-Gusa Jeepney Terminal and Westbound-Bulua Integrated Bus and Jeepney Terminal.

Air 

Lumbia Airport, also known as Cagayan de Oro Airport (now Lumbia Airfield), hosted domestic service to Manila, Cebu, Davao and Iloilo. Manila is 75 minutes away by air, Iloilo one hour and Cebu 45 minutes, and Davao 25 minutes. It was the second-busiest airport in Mindanao, after Francisco Bangoy International Airport in Davao City.

Laguindingan International Airport (which opened June 15, 2013, replacing Lumbia) is in the municipality of Laguindingan, Misamis Oriental. It serves northern Mindanao (including Iligan and Cagayan de Oro), offering domestic service throughout the Philippines. It will offer international flights in the future.

Sea 

 
Cagayan de Oro Port is an international seaport situated near the estuary of the Cagayan de Oro River. With the recent completion of the 250 million peso rehabilitation project, it is the largest seaport in Mindanao. The port has regular service to Manila, Cebu, Tagbilaran, Bacolod, Dumaguete, Iloilo and Jagna.

See also 

 Metro Manila

References 

Cagayan de Oro List of Hotels

Cagayan de Oro
Cagayan de Oro